Kunturwasa (Quechua kuntur condor, wasa back, "condor back",  Hispanicized spelling Condorhuasa) is a mountain in the Andes of Peru, about  high. It is situated in the Puno Region, Melgar Province, Macari District, north of a plain called Pampa Tinaya, north-east of Macari.

References

Mountains of Peru
Mountains of Puno Region